Iran participated in the 1982 Asian Games held in the capital city of New Delhi. This country is ranked 7th with only 4 gold medals in this edition of the Asiad.

Medal summary

Medal table

Medalists

Results by event

Cycling

Football 

Men

Weightlifting

Wrestling

Men's freestyle

References

  Iran Olympic Committee - Asian Games Medalists
  Iran National Sports Organization - Asian Games Medalists

Nations at the 1982 Asian Games
1982
Asian Games